The 2012 Dayton Silverbacks season is the seventh season for the Continental Indoor Football League (CIFL) franchise.

After much speculation about whether or not the Silverbacks would leave the CIFL and join the Ultimate Indoor Football League, the Silverbacks management made an announcement that they would be staying in the CIFL and helping the league rebuild after losing its top two teams from the 2011 season. Coach Derrick Shepad resigned at the end of the 2011 season. On September 8, 2011, Mister Askew was named the 6th coach in Silverbacks history. On February 9, 2012, it was announced that Silverbacks Football LLC, in which Jeff Kolaczkowski of Dayton acted as president of that organization, decided they would be stepping out of the world of football and selling the team to an ownership group. The Dayton Silverbacks were sold to MRL Sports Entertainment LLC. There are currently three members on the ownership board for MRL Sports Entertainment LLC and all three board members were current members of the Dayton Silverbacks front office staff. Those members were Michael Lause, April Shellenberger and Tyree Fields. On March 1, just ten days before the season started, the Silverback fired Head Coach Mister Askew. The reasons for his termination have yet to be determined. Before the season started, Fields left the team in all capacities, leaving only Lause and Shellenberger. Then after one week of the season, Lause left the team as well for reasons that are unknown. With Shelleberger the lone person in charge, there is doubt that the team will survive past the 2012 season.

The Silverbacks finished with a team record 8 wins (the previous team record was 5) as they finished the season 8-1.

They were defeated by the Saginaw Sting, 7-35, in the 2012 CIFL Championship Game.

Players

Free agents

Final roster

Regular season

Regular season

Standings

y - clinched regular-season title

x - clinched playoff spot

Week 1: vs Indianapolis Enforcers

The first quarter opened with Dayton scoring in the first two minutes into the game on a seven-yard run by Marcus Fails. The extra point by Jeff Hubbard failed and Dayton led 6–0. With a minute left in the first quarter, Bruce Peters ran in from four yards out and Dayton was up 12-0. The Enforcers scored with 55 seconds left in the quarter when Jamie Barnes caught a 23-yard pass from quarterback Anthony Duckett. The PAT was good by Pavel Polochanin.

Dayton continued with a second quarter. Halfway through the quarter, Evan Sawyer scored on a 1-yard run. Jeff Hubbard added the PAT and Dayton led 19-7. With 5:18 to play in the half, Trey Jackson recorded a safety and the Silverbacks were up 21-7. The first-half scoring closed with 4:07 remaining on Sawyer's 23-yard run. Peters ran in for the two-point conversion and Dayton led 29-7 at halftime.

The second half belonged to the Silverbacks as well. Dayton scored six points in the third to lead 35-7 after three and added two more scores in the fourth to win going away 48-7. Sawyer had a memorable CIFL debut as he recorded 5 touchdowns (4 rushing and one passing). Duckett on the other had one to forget, as he set an Enforcers, and CIFL, record with 7 interceptions. The 7 interceptions by the Silverbacks set a CIFL record for a single game. The previous record had been 6, held by the Cincinnati Commandos who set the mark in 2011 against Indianapolis.

Week 2: vs Port Huron Patriots

Dayton opened the scoring first with Evan Sawyer taking the ball in from 1 yard out. The PAT was kicked by Zack VanZant and the Silverbacks led 7-0. The Patriots came right back down the field and scored on 4-yard run by Tracey McIntyre with 5:52 left in the opening stanza. Mark Carter ran in the two-point conversion and the host led 8-7. Dayton took the next possession and moved down the field and answered the call with touchdown with 1:47 left in the quarter. Sawyer passed the ball to Bruce Peters from seven yards out, and VanZant added the PAT. At the end of the first quarter, Dayton led 14-8.

With 9:59 left in the first half, VanZant kicked a 16-yard field goal. With 5:45 left in the half, Sawyer threw a 25-yard touchdown pass to Antwain Weeden. The extra point was good and they led 24-8. Port Huron answered the bell when Terry Michell caught a 6-yard pass from Michael McKinley, but Carson Nowakowski's kick was no good. Weeden took the ensuing kickoff and ran 52 yards for a touchdown to close the half, but the PAT failed. At halftime, Dayton led 30-14.

Darryl Johnson threw a 14-yard pass to Jose Morris to open up the second half scoring. Port Huron went for two points and failed. Dayton then came back and scored with 4 minutes left in the quarter when Sawyer threw a 44 yards pass to Tyler Waller. The third quarter ended and the Silverbacks led 36-22.

In the fourth quarter, Dayton added two touchdowns to close out the scoring and win the game 50-22.

With the win, the Silverbacks improved to 2-0.

Week 3: vs Chicago Vipers

In the first quarter Sawyer hit a wide open Tyler Waller on a 26-yard pass play and it was quickly 6-0 the extra point was blocked. After a safety it was 8 - 0 Dayton after the first quarter.

In the 2nd quarter after Chicago kicker Julie Harshbarger missed a 27-yard field goal Evan sawyer capped off an eight play drive, with a six-yard run and with the extra point made it 15 - 0 Silverbacks, but the Vipers came right back and scored with less than a minute to go in the first half, Anthony Kropp connected with Dan Carter, who made a great one handed catch in the end zone and it was 15-6 Silverbacks. Just seconds later the Silverbacks would answer with a six-yard pass from Evan Sawyer to Bruce Peters and it was 21-6 at the half.

After the Silverback defense stopped the Vipers at their own 14, just two plays later Evan sawyer scored on an eight-yard run and a Zach VanZant extra point made it a 27-6 Dayton lead. Chicago came back with a score of their own on an Anthony Kropp nine-yard pass to Dan Carter, the extra point was good and it was 27 - 13 Dayton. Dayton would put it away after Sawyer scampered in on a one-yard run with 1:19 left in the third quarter and it was 34-13 Silverbacks after the 3rd quarter.

In the final quarter, Dayton's Chris Stanford hit Lawrence Green on a four-yard pass and Marcus Fails intercepted a pass and ran it in from 25 yards out and it was a 48-13.

With the win, the Silverbacks improved to 3-0.

Week 4: vs Port Huron Patriots

After the Port Huron Patriots saw their entire coaching staff, quarterback and a kicker change, the Patriots went on the road for their first road game in franchise history against the undefeated Silverbacks. New Patriot quarterback Torrance Webster threw a pair of touchdowns to Jose' Cannon, and ran in another score. New Patriot kicker Chris Kolias was 1 for 2 on field goal attempts, and 3 for 3 in extra point attempts. In the end, it was Webster's three interceptions that cost the Patriots the game, as the final one was taken back 40 yards by Melvin Thomas to ultimately seal the win for the Silverbacks. Evan Sawyer continued his good play contributing 3 touchdowns, two passing and running another score in.

With the win, the Silverbacks improved to 4-0.

Coaching staff

References

2012 Continental Indoor Football League season
Dayton Sharks
Dayton Silverbacks